The Mbam languages are a group of Bantu languages spoken in Cameroon
Sanaga (A60): Tuki (Bacenga), Leti/Mengisa, Mbwasa
West Mbam (A40): Bati (A60), Nomaande (Mandi)–Tunen (Aling'a, Banen)–Tuotomb–Yambeta, Nyokon
Yambasa (A60): Nubaca, Mbule, Nugunu, Elip–Mmaala–Yangben

References

 
Southern Bantoid languages